Blood Like Lemonade is the seventh studio album by the British band Morcheeba, released on 7 June 2010 in the United Kingdom. The album marks the return of former lead singer Skye Edwards, who left the band in 2003. The first single released was "Even Though". Paul Godfrey said, "This is the record we should have made after Big Calm [Morcheeba's second album, released in 1998] but we had to travel treacherous terrains to get back to our natural habitat."

The group embarked on a tour of the United Kingdom, Europe and the US to promote the album in autumn 2010.

Track listing

Charts

Weekly charts

Year-end charts

Certifications

In 2010 it was awarded a silver certification from the Independent Music Companies Association, which indicated sales of at least 30,000 copies throughout Europe. In 2011 it was upgraded to gold certification for 75,000 copies sold in Europe.

References

External links
 Morcheeba official website

2010 albums
Morcheeba albums
PIAS Recordings albums